Kyle Johnson (born 30 September 1993) is an American tennis player, who also represented El Salvador at the Davis Cup because of his maternal Salvadoran roots. In Davis Cup competition, he has a win-loss record of 0–1.

Johnson studied and played collegiately at DePaul University, between 2012 and 2016.

Davis Cup

Participations: (0–1)

   indicates the outcome of the Davis Cup match followed by the score, date, place of event, the zonal classification and its phase, and the court surface.

References

External links

1993 births
Living people
American male tennis players
Salvadoran male tennis players
DePaul Blue Demons men's tennis players
American sportspeople of Salvadoran descent
Citizens of El Salvador through descent
Sportspeople from Charlotte, North Carolina
Tennis players at the 2019 Pan American Games
Pan American Games competitors for El Salvador